Run! Bitch Run! is a 2009 American rape and revenge film emulating the style of grindhouse-era productions.  It follows two Catholic schoolgirls who, selling religious paraphernalia door-to-door to fund their education, are brutally raped and left for dead.  One of them, surviving the affair, returns with a shotgun to exact revenge on her tormentors.

External links

2009 films
2009 horror films
American horror drama films
2000s exploitation films
American rape and revenge films
American independent films
Films set in the 1970s
2009 independent films
2000s crime drama films
2009 drama films
2000s English-language films
2000s American films